Rodolfo Fernando Salas Crespo (25 May 1928 – 18 August 2010) was a Peruvian basketball player. He competed in the men's tournament at the 1948 Summer Olympics.

References

External links
 

1928 births
2010 deaths
Peruvian men's basketball players
1954 FIBA World Championship players
Olympic basketball players of Peru
Basketball players at the 1948 Summer Olympics
Sportspeople from Lima
1950 FIBA World Championship players
20th-century Peruvian people